Natchaug Elementary School is a public elementary school in Willimantic, Connecticut, United States. The school opened in 1865 and is located at the junction of Milk Street and Jackson Street in downtown Willimantic. It is one of four elementary schools in the Windham Public School system, and is accredited by the New England Association of Schools and Colleges. The name "Natchaug" comes from the Native American Nipmuc word meaning "land between the rivers."
The school colors are bright green and blue.

Student composition 
Natchaug is a public school open to students from kindergarten through fifth grade, after which they move on to Windham Middle School. In the 2021-22 school year there were 278 enrolled students in grades K-5. With 26 classroom teachers, the school has a student-teacher ratio of about 11:1. Natchaug also has a Family Resource Center and before- and after-school programs for its students. 

As of the 2021-22 school year, the majority ethnic group is Hispanic students, who make up about three fourths of the student body. About 17% of students were non-Hispanic white, and smaller numbers Asian, Black, American Indian, multiracial or of other backgrounds. Of the educators at the school, about 81% were white and 16% Hispanic. About three fourths of the school's students qualify for free or reduced-price lunch, so, overall, the students' families are poorer than the average for all Connecticut public schools (43% qualify for the lunch program).

Bilingual education 
Natchaug has had bilingual education programs for Spanish-speakers in place since the 1980s, in accordance with state legislation. 
Currently about half of Natchaug students are classified as English Language Learners, in comparison to 9% of all public school students statewide. 

In Windham School District overall, 31% of students are English Learners. The school district started dual-language programs in 2018-19, with the aim of promoting bilingualism among primarily Spanish-speaking children and primarily English-speaking children.

COVID-19 puppetry program
In response to the COVID-19 pandemic's impact on children's emotional well being, Natchaug's teachers have begun using a puppet-based model for helping students learn to recognize and manage feelings. The program is based on cognitive behavioral therapy principles, and Natchaug staff have worked with the University of Connecticut's school of puppetry to develop lessons in short puppeteered films. Students also get kits to make their own puppets.

History

Natchaug School was originally for students from elementary through high school. The school was initially a large wooden building, completed in 1864 to replace the old stone schoolhouse that had served the students on the east side of Willimantic since 1831. In the late 1870s, pupils included several visiting students from China, who had been sent by the Qing dynasty as the educational mission of its Self-Strengthening Movement. The visiting students were Chang Yau Kung, Won Bing Chung, and Sung Mun Wai.  Natchaug High School was part of the school until 1897.

In 1914, the original wooden school was torn down to make way for the current brick structure. 

The school was closed for 18 months (June 2012 to January 2014) due to roof damage. During that time, students attended elementary school classes at Windham Middle School.

Principals
Eben Jones (2017-present)
Robert Kallajian (2016–2017)
Melissa Mishriky Cyr (2015-2016)
Jeff Wihbey (2010-2012)
Joseph Janisaitis (2008-2010)
Rose Bisson (2004-2008)
Penny Hebert (interim)
Maureen Bojka (2003-2004, interim)
Kathleen Rosewall (2002-2003)
Collette Trailor (c. 1999-2002)
Susan Webb (1990s)

In earlier decades, principals included:
James L. Harroun (1892-c.1927)
George Cadwell (1888-1892)
William Burdick (1884-1888)
Col. John B. Welch (1872-1884)
Thomas H. Fuller (1868-1872)
David P. Corbin (1866-1868)
S. W. Powell (1865-1866)

Notable alumni
Wilbur Cross, literary critic and 71st governor of Connecticut
William Sprague, Congregationalist clergyman
Isaiah Oggins, American-born spy for the Soviet Union
Sung Mun Wai (宋文翙), participant in the 1870s Chinese Educational Mission and Vice Admiral in the Chinese Navy
George Ernest Waldo, U.S. Representative from New York (1905–09)

References

Willimantic, Connecticut
Windham, Connecticut
Schools in Windham County, Connecticut
Public elementary schools in Connecticut
Elementary schools in Connecticut
Elementary
Connecticut
Educational institutions established in 1865
1865 establishments in Connecticut